The S.I.R. Method of Recruiting is a long-term strategy adopted by progressive organizations who wish to gain a competitive advantage in the "war on talent."  S.I.R. is the acronym for Streamlined Internal Recruiting, and leverages the power of both technology and external recruiting agencies to effectively reduce cost-per-hire, while increasing overall process efficiency.

This recruiting philosophy was first utilized in 2008, at the beginning of the American economic recession, and has gained a following by the Human Resources and Recruitment community within forward-thinking organizations.  At the root of its success lies the fusion of traditional headhunters, social media, and video hiring.

S.I.R. partners are outsourced providers of recruiting-specific services that enable the adopter of the S.I.R. Method to reach their maximum productivity.

Recruitment